"Marxism and Problems of Linguistics" is an article written by Joseph Stalin, most of which was first published on June 20, 1950 in the newspaper "Pravda" (the "answers" attached at the end came later, in July and August), and was in the same year published as a pamphlet in large numbers.

The article appeared in the context of the last wave of publications by Marrists who supported the Japhetic theory, attacking the "old" linguistics, that had started in Pravda on May 9, 1950. Yet, instead of supporting Marrism, Stalin brought the campaign into a full turn, decisively finishing Marrism's acceptability in Soviet science. The "discussion" in the paper lingered a little while longer but didn't bring much new, due to the impossibility of arguing with Stalin, and the field of Soviet linguistics was effectively shifted. The next year, the Academy of Sciences published a hardbound volume of commentaries named "Session of the Department of Social Sciences of the Academy of Sciences of the U.S.S.R. devoted to the anniversary of the publication of "Marxism and Problems of Linguistics", running a print of 10,000.

References

Bibliography

 

Works by Joseph Stalin
1950 documents
Works originally published in Pravda
1950 in the Soviet Union